Tony Mamodaly (born 2 August 1990) is a sports agent and former professional footballer who played as a forward. Born in Germany, he represented Madagascar at international level.

Early and personal life
Mamodaly was born in Mannheim, Germany. His father was from Madagascar. Mamodaly initially combined his football career with handball, playing for Rhein-Neckar Löwen and the German national youth team, before giving it up to concentrate on football.

Club career
Mamodaly joined TSG 1899 Hoffenheim at the age of 16. After playing with Karlsruher SC II, he trialled with Scottish club Dundee United along with eight teammates, including Lukas Rupp and Matthias Zimmermann. His proposed transfer to Dundee fell through and he instead moved to Dynamo Dresden II, signing for them in October 2009. Mamodaly viewed his time with Dynamo Dresden as a "catastrophe" and that he was bullied by the manager. After two years he trialled with French club Lorient, but that transfer also fell through. He left Dynamo Dresden, and trained with a VDV camp for contractless players. He trialled with 1. FC Nürnberg.

He moved to the United States to play college soccer with the St. Thomas University Bobcats. He spent four seasons with the team, and became their captain. He ended his career in 2016 due to knee problems.

International career
Mamodaly earned two caps for Madagascar in 2010.

Later career
Mamodaly began studying for an MBA at Columbia University before returning to Miami to undertake a master's degree. He also set up a sports agency for young players from Germany, Italy and Brazil to study and play in the United States.

References

1990 births
Living people
Footballers from Mannheim
German people of Malagasy descent
Sportspeople of Malagasy descent
People with acquired Malagasy citizenship
German footballers
Malagasy footballers
Association football forwards
Madagascar international footballers
TSG 1899 Hoffenheim players
Karlsruher SC II players
Dynamo Dresden II players
German expatriate footballers
German expatriate sportspeople in the United States
Expatriate soccer players in the United States
German sports agents